United Nations Security Council Resolution 474, adopted on June 17, 1980, after recalling resolutions 425 (1978), 426 (1978), 427 (1978), 434 (1978), 444 (1979), 450 (1979), 459 (1979) and 467 (1980), and considering the report from the Secretary-General on the United Nations Interim Force in Lebanon (UNIFIL), the Council noted the continuing need for the Force given the situation between Israel and Lebanon.

The resolution went on to extend the mandate of UNIFIL until December 19, 1980, strongly condemning all actions taken against the Force. It was adopted by 12 votes to none, while East Germany and the Soviet Union abstained, and China did not participate.

See also
 Blue Line
 Israel–Lebanon conflict
 List of United Nations Security Council Resolutions 401 to 500 (1976–1982)

References
Text of the Resolution at undocs.org

External links
 

 0474
Israeli–Lebanese conflict
 0474
1980 in Israel
 0474
June 1980 events